"Miss Independent" is a song by American singer-songwriter Ne-Yo. It is the second single from his album. Year of the Gentleman (2008), and was produced by Stargate. It samples the song "Forget About Me" by Keesha (Lil Bit).  The song was written by Ne-Yo and co-written by Stargate. It was released as a music download on August 26, 2008, and physical release on September 2, 2008.

Chart performance
"Miss Independent" debuted at number 98 on the US Billboard Hot 100 chart, on the week of September 6, 2008. The next week, the song made a big jump to number 32 on the chart. The following week, the song climbed to number 27. The song finally hit the top ten in its eighth week, climbing to number nine on the chart, giving Ne-Yo his second consecutive top ten single from the album. It eventually reached its peak at number seven on the chart, the week of December 13, 2008. On July 31, 2009, the single was certified platinum by the Recording Industry Association of America (RIAA) for sales of over a million digital copies in the United States.

On the US Hot R&B/Hip-Hop Songs chart, the song has been much more successful than the first single from the album, "Closer", reaching number one, giving Ne-Yo his first chart-topper as a performer (on that chart). In the United Kingdom, the song entered the UK Singles Chart at number 39 on downloads alone on August 31, 2008. The single later reached it peak at number six on the chart.

Music video
The music video of "Miss Independent" was shot with director Chris Robinson on Monday, December 8, 2008, in Santa Monica, California.  It featured cameos from Kevin Hart, Keri Hilson, Gabrielle Union, Lauren London and Trey Songz. It begins with Ne-Yo as a corporate boss walking to his office through his employee's office. As he walks by, various office workers (played by various singers) say good morning to Ne-Yo, who is enjoying the sight of all the women. The video continues with Ne-Yo at a meeting getting interrupted by his boss (played by Union) who apologizes to him in the end and asks what she can do to make it up to him.

Awards
On February 8, 2009, at the 51st Grammy Awards, Ne-Yo won two awards for "Miss Independent", Best Male R&B Vocal Performance and Best R&B Song.

Track listing
German and UK CD single
 "Miss Independent" - 3:52
 "Miss Independent" (Instrumental) - 3:50
 "Closer" (Stonebridge Club Remix) - 3:52
 "Miss Independent" (Video) - 3:50

Charts

Weekly charts

Monthly charts

Year-end charts

Certifications

Remix: "She Got Her Own" (Miss Independent Part 2)

The official remix entitled "She Got Her Own" (Miss Independent Part 2) was released as a single for both Ne-Yo and singer/actor Jamie Foxx and features rapper Fabolous. It is available as a bonus track in Japan and the pre-order of Year of the Gentleman in the UK iTunes Store. The song was also featured on Foxx's album, Intuition and was released as the second single from the album on December 14, 2008. It samples the 1979 song "My Baby Understands" by Donna Summer.

A music video for "She Got Her Own" was released on September 22, 2008. It featured cameo appearances by Estelle, Eve, Keyshia Cole, Jill Marie Jones, Teyana Taylor and twins Malika Haqq & Khadijah Haqq from the 2006 film ATL . Ne-Yo, Jamie Foxx, and Fabolous performed "She Got Her Own" at the 2009 BET Awards.

Other remixes
A remix that features T-Pain & Joey Galaxy aka Young Cash was made. Nicki Minaj also remixed it. Jamaican dancehall artists Vybz Kartel and Spice also released a version of the song entitled "Ramping Shop", from his album Pon Di Gaza 2.0 which received critical acclaim across the world. Other Jamaican artists like Busy Signal, Sizzla and others did versions of the song as well.

Charts

Weekly charts

Year-end charts

See also
 List of R&B number-one singles of 2008 (U.S.)

References

External links
 Ne-Yo - She Got Her Own ft. Jamie Foxx, Fabolous (Official Music Video) at YouTube

2008 singles
Music videos directed by Chris Robinson (director)
Ne-Yo songs
Jamie Foxx songs
Fabolous songs
Def Jam Recordings singles
Songs with feminist themes
Songs written by Ne-Yo
Songs written by Tor Erik Hermansen
Songs written by Mikkel Storleer Eriksen
Song recordings produced by Stargate (record producers)
2007 songs